Frontal lobe disorder, also frontal lobe syndrome, is an impairment of the frontal lobe of the brain due to disease or frontal lobe injury. The frontal lobe plays a key role in executive functions such as motivation, planning, social behaviour, and speech production. Frontal lobe syndrome can be caused by a range of conditions including head trauma, tumours, neurodegenerative diseases, neurodevelopmental disorders, neurosurgery and cerebrovascular disease. Frontal lobe impairment can be detected by recognition of typical signs and symptoms, use of simple screening tests, and specialist neurological testing.

Signs and symptoms 

The signs and symptoms of frontal lobe disorder can be indicated by dysexecutive syndrome which consists of a number of symptoms which tend to occur together. Broadly speaking, these symptoms fall into three main categories; cognitive (movement and speech), emotional or behavioral. Although many of these symptoms regularly co-occur, it is common to encounter patients who have several, but not all of these symptoms. This is one reason why some researchers are beginning to argue that dysexecutive syndrome is not the best term to describe these various symptoms. The fact that many of the dysexecutive syndrome symptoms can occur alone has led some researchers to suggest that the symptoms should not be labelled as a "syndrome" as such. Some of the latest imaging research on frontal cortex areas suggests that executive functions may be more discrete than was previously thought.

Signs/symptoms can be divided as follows:

Causes
The causes of frontal lobe disorders can be closed head injury. An example of this can be from an accident, which can cause damage to the orbitofrontal cortex area of the brain.

Cerebrovascular disease may cause a stroke in the frontal lobe. Tumours such as meningiomas may present with a frontal lobe syndrome. Frontal lobe impairment is also a feature of Alzheimer's disease, and frontotemporal dementia.

Pathogenesis
The pathogenesis of frontal lobe disorders entails various pathologies, some are as follows:

Anatomy and functions
The frontal lobe contains the precentral gyrus and prefrontal cortex and, by some conventions, the orbitofrontal cortex. These three areas are represented in both the left and the right cerebral hemispheres. The precentral gyrus or primary motor cortex is concerned with the planning, initiation and control of fine motor movements dorsolateral to each hemisphere. The dorsolateral part of the frontal lobe is concerned with planning, strategy formation, and other executive functions. The prefrontal cortex in the left hemisphere is involved with verbal memory while the prefrontal cortex in the right hemisphere is involved in spatial memory. The left frontal operculum region of the prefrontal cortex, or Broca's area, is responsible for expressive language, i.e. language production. The orbitofrontal cortex is concerned with response inhibition, impulse control, and social behaviour.

Diagnosis

The diagnosis of frontal lobe disorder can be divided into the following three categories:
 Clinical history
Frontal lobe disorders may be recognized through a sudden and dramatic change in a person's personality, for example with loss of social awareness, disinhibition, emotional instability, irritability or impulsiveness. Alternatively, the disorder may become apparent because of mood changes such as depression, anxiety or apathy.
 Examination
On mental state examination a person with frontal lobe damage may show speech problems, with reduced verbal fluency. Typically the person is lacking in insight and judgment, but does not have marked cognitive abnormalities or memory impairment (as measured for example by the mini-mental state examination). With more severe impairment there may be echolalia or mutism. Neurological examination may show primitive reflexes (also known as frontal release signs) such as the grasp reflex. Akinesia (lack of spontaneous movement) will be present in more severe and advanced cases.
 Further investigation
A range of neuropsychological tests are available for clarifying the nature and extent of frontal lobe dysfunction. For example, concept formation and ability to shift mental sets can be measured with the Wisconsin Card Sorting Test, planning can be assessed with the Mazes subtest of the WISC. Frontotemporal dementia shows up as atrophy of the frontal cortex on MRI. Frontal impairment due to head injuries, tumours or cerebrovascular disease will also appear on brain imaging.

Treatment
In terms of treatment for frontal lobe disorder, there is none, general supportive care is given, also some level of supervision could be needed. The prognosis will depend on the cause of the disorder, of course. A possible complication is that individuals with severe injuries may be disabled, such that, a caregiver may be unrecognizable to the person. Another aspect of treatment of frontal lobe disorder is speech therapy. This type of therapy might help individuals with symptoms that are associated with aphasia and dysarthria.

History
Phineas Gage, who sustained a severe frontal lobe injury in 1848, has been called a case of dysexecutive syndrome. Gage's psychological changes are almost always exaggeratedof the symptoms listed, the only ones Gage can be said to have exhibited are "anger and frustration", slight memory impairment, and "difficulty in planning".

See also 

 Attention
 Cognitive neuropsychology
 Dysexecutive syndrome
 Executive functions
 Frontal lobe
 Gourmand syndrome
 Klüver–Bucy syndrome
 Phineas Gage
 Working memory

References

Further reading

External links 

Neurobiological brain disorder
Cognitive neuroscience
Frontal lobe
Mental disorders due to brain damage